Leandro Sapetti (born 30 January 1989) is an Argentine professional footballer who plays as a left back for Brown de Adrogué.

Career
Sapetti was promoted into the first-team of Gimnasia y Esgrima in 2010. He made eighteen appearances in his first season, including his professional debut on 6 November against Quilmes. Over the course of the following two campaigns, in Primera B Nacional following relegation in 2010–11, Sapetti was selected to appear just twice. In June 2013, Villa San Carlos of Primera B Nacional loaned Sapetti. He netted his first senior career goal in his seventh appearance for the club, during a tie with Patronato on 6 October. In total, Sapetti appeared in thirty-seven games and scored four times as Villa San Carlos were relegated.

He returned to Gimnasia y Esgrima in June 2014, but was immediately loaned to a second tier team again - Instituto. Sapetti remained with Instituto for two seasons, 2014 and 2015, and scored three goals in forty-five matches. After leaving Instituto, he also left Gimnasia y Esgrima permanently in 2016 by joining Argentine Primera División side Temperley. He scored in his second appearance, versus Atlético de Rafaela, but would only make eight appearances in two seasons with the club. July 2017 saw Sapetti make the move to Primera B Nacional's Villa Dálmine, which preceded a change to Aldosivi a year later.

Career statistics
.

References

External links

1989 births
Living people
Footballers from La Plata
Argentine footballers
Association football defenders
Argentine Primera División players
Primera Nacional players
Club de Gimnasia y Esgrima La Plata footballers
Club Atlético Villa San Carlos footballers
Instituto footballers
Club Atlético Temperley footballers
Villa Dálmine footballers
Aldosivi footballers
Club Atlético Brown footballers